Yu Linxiang (born January 1945) is a retired general (shangjiang) who served as political commissar of the People's Armed Police of China.

Biography 
Yu was born in 1945 in Yingcheng, Hubei in January 1945, and joined the Chinese Communist Party in April 1966.  Yu attained the rank of general on June 24, 2006.  He has served in a number of roles since joining the Party.  Yu was first appointed to be the deputy director of the 1st Army, and then the political commissar of the 2nd legion.  He has held simultaneous posts as the political commissar of the first division of the Beijing city PAP and the deputy director of the political bureau of the PAP.  He next served as the head of the Ministry of Organization under the divisional People's Liberation Army political ministry.  Yu then took up the posts of assistant head of the Lanzhou Military Region and the political commissar of the Xinjiang Military District under the Lanzhou MR.  He was promoted to political commissar of the Lanzhou MR in December 2004.  In September 2007, Yu assumed became political commissar of the People's Armed Police. He was also a member of the 17th Central Committee of the Chinese Communist Party.

References

1945 births
Living people
Politicians from Xiaogan
People's Liberation Army generals from Hubei
Chinese Communist Party politicians from Hubei
People's Republic of China politicians from Hubei
Delegates to the 11th National People's Congress